D.I. is an American punk rock band formed in 1981 in Fullerton, California. It was founded by vocalist and primary songwriter Casey Royer, after previously playing drums in the bands Adolescents and Social Distortion.

Since its formation, D.I. has had many line-up changes over the years with Royer being the only constant member of the band. The band has continued to work, although they have had inactive periods, which include the band going on hiatus between albums. During their years of touring and recording albums, D.I. have never gained a huge mainstream success, but they have influenced many of the 1990s era melodic hardcore punk and punk rock revival bands, including Face to Face, Guttermouth, Jughead's Revenge, The Offspring, and Pennywise. Members of the band also joined up with Daddy X and the Dirtball of the Kottonmouth Kings, to create the punk rock band the X-Pistols, in 2010.

History

Early history (1981–1986)
D.I. was formed in 1981 after the Adolescents' first break-up. The band's name initially stood for "Drug Ideology", but now, the initials no longer have any meaning. Their original line-up consisted of Casey Royer on vocals, Tim Maag on guitar, Fredric Taccone on bass guitar, and Derek O'Brien on drums. The band combined the Orange County hardcore punk sound with a decidedly surf and new wave style on their debut self-titled EP. The EP featured five songs, including "Richard Hung Himself" (originally written by Casey Royer while he played for the Adolescents, recorded with the Adolescents and later re-recorded with D.I.), "Venus De Milo", "Reagan der Führer", "Purgatory", and "Guns". This EP was later reissued as Team Goon with extra tracks including versions of Gary Glitter's "Rock and Roll Part II", The Saint and Nuclear Funeral. The album was later released as a CD which added a cover of DEVO's Uncontrollable Urge which itself was originally released by XXX Records as the B-side on the 7-inch e.p. along with Surfing Anarchy

The band's first studio album Ancient Artifacts was a more straight ahead Orange County-sounding album that included a new version of "Purgatory" from the EP. Not long after the release of Ancient Artifacts, D.I. returned to the studio to record their second album Horse Bites Dog Cries, which was not released until 1986 (although the album itself has copyright date of 1985). This is generally considered their best studio album.

Two more albums and hiatus (1987–1992)
Before recording sessions for their next album commenced, guitarist Rikk Agnew left D.I. in 1987 to pursue his career with the Adolescents, who released two more albums (Brats in Battalions, and Balboa Fun*Zone) before breaking-up again. Agnew was replaced in D.I. by Hedge on bass guitar. Alfie Agnew played guitar, and Bosco was switched from bass to second guitar. Eventually Mark "The Kid" Cerneka from Brea Olinda High School replaced Alfie. The resulting album, What Good Is Grief to a God? (1988), was a commercial failure. After the 1988 US tour, "The Kid" left and was replaced by Sean Elliot. The 7-inch Single. "Don't Do It" b/w "Johnny's Got a Problem" was released that year on Triple X, blue vinyl in partnership with Circle A Skateboards. This was given away as a promo with a skateboard. Some released with picture sleeves. In 1989, D.I. released their next album Tragedy Again. That year another 7-inch Single was released on red vinyl again on Triple X records. "Surfin' Anarchy" (Beach Boys cover) b/w "Uncontrollable Urge" (Devo cover)

Return and more line-up changes (1993–2010)
A live album, Live at a Dive, was released in 1993. After Stevie DRT left the band, original drummer John Knight rejoined, and their fifth album State of Shock was released the following year. Chris Roboson and Steve Lyen joined and continued playing from 1995 to 1997. The band lost their record label soon afterwards. After two years of strictly playing live shows, and original guitarist Tim Maag replacing Roboson, D.I. headed back into the studio around 1997 to record what would be their follow-up to State of Shock and shopped the tracks around to labels without finding a taker.

Numerous line-up changes went on before they solidified their line-up, consisting of Royer, Chckn (guitars), Clinton Calton (guitars), Eddie Tatar (bass) and Joey Tatar (drums). Royer remained the only constant member of the band. D.I. continued touring for years and released their first original album in eight years, titled Caseyology, in 2002. Caseyology was followed up five years later by On the Western Front (2007) released on the Suburban Noize label, with all music and lyrics written by Royer and Tatar. In 2009, the band released the tracks "Potbelly", "D.I.", "The Dehumanizers", and "Embrace The Kill – Shut the Fuck Up and Listen!!!" through PB Records.

Recent activities (2011–present)
In March 2011, Casey Royer was arrested for child abuse, child endangerment and overdosing on heroin in the presence of his 12-year-old son. The child abuse and child endangerment charges were dropped, but he was sentenced to a 90-day jail term and placed on probation for three years for the substance abuse misdemeanor. After this, Royer got clean and sober, and D.I. returned to touring and playing live shows.

In 2012, the band released a new 7-inch EP, United We Slam  through Hand Grenade Records.

Line-ups

Timeline

Discography

Studio releases

EP, compilation and live albums

References

External links
 D.I. on Myspace
 
 

Musical groups established in 1981
Hardcore punk groups from California
Suburban Noize Records artists
Rock music supergroups
1981 establishments in California
Musical groups from Orange County, California